The 1990–91 Wake Forest Demon Deacons men's basketball team represented Wake Forest University during the 1990–91 NCAA men's basketball season.

Roster

Schedule and results

|-
!colspan=9 style=| Non-conference regular Season

|-
!colspan=9 style=| ACC Regular Season

|-
!colspan=9 style=| ACC Tournament

|-
!colspan=9 style=| NCAA Tournament

Rankings

References

Wake Forest Demon Deacons men's basketball seasons
Wake Forest
Wake Forest